Phreatia micrantha, commonly known as the native fan orchid, is a plant in the orchid family and is an epiphyte or lithophyte with four to ten channelled leaves in a fan-like arrangement with their bases sheathing the stem. A large number of small white, cup-shaped flowers are arranged along a thin, wiry flowering stem. This orchid is native to areas between Papuasia and the western Pacific.

Description
Flowering occurs between October and February.

Taxonomy and naming
The native fan orchid was first formally described in 1834 by Achille Richard who gave it the name Oberonia micrantha and published the description in Voyage de la corvette l'Astrolabe: exécuté par ordre du roi, pendant les années 1826-1827-1828-1829. In 1859 John Lindley changed the name to Phreatia micrantha. The specific epithet (micrantha) is derived from the Ancient Greek words mikros meaning "small" or "little" and anthos meaning "flower".

Distribution and habitat
Phreatia micrantha usually grows on rainforest trees sometimes on rocks. It is most common on mossy branches over streams. It is found on the Bismarck Archipelago, New Guinea, the Solomon Islands, Queensland (Australia), Fiji, Niue, New Caledonia, Samoa, Santa Cruz Island, Tonga, Vanuatu, the Wallis and Futuna Islands and the Mariana Islands. In Queensland it occurs between the Iron Range and Tully River on the Cape York Peninsula.

References

micrantha
Plants described in 1834
Orchids of Queensland
Orchids of Papua New Guinea
Orchids of New Caledonia